Zabrini is a tribe of ground beetles in the subfamily Pterostichinae of beetle family Carabidae, found mainly in North America and Europe. There are more than 750 described species in three genera of Zabrini, more than 600 of which are in the genus Amara.

Genera
There are three genera in the tribe Zabrini, within two subtribes:
 Subtribe Amarina Zimmermann, 1832
 Amara Bonelli, 1810 – Sun beetles
 Pseudamara Lindroth, 1968
 Subtribe Zabrina Bonelli, 1810
 Zabrus Clairville, 1806

References

Pterostichinae